The Goddard United Methodist Church formerly the Dodson Avenue Methodist Episcopal Church, is a historic church at 1922 Dodson Avenue in Fort Smith, Arkansas.  The church building is an imposing Late Gothic stone structure, built in 1930 to a design by the local architectural firm of Haralson and Nelson.  The congregation for which it was built was founded in 1908, and worshipped in a wood-frame church at this site prior to the construction of the present edifice.  In October 1945 the church was renamed the Goddard Memorial Methodist Church in honor of a recent pastor, Dr. O. E. Goddard.  The church complex includes, in addition to the church, a children's building, fellowship hall, and office building.

The church was listed on the National Register of Historic Places in 2006.

See also
National Register of Historic Places listings in Sebastian County, Arkansas

References

External links
Goddard United Methodist Church web site

Methodist churches in Arkansas
Churches on the National Register of Historic Places in Arkansas
Gothic Revival church buildings in Arkansas
Churches completed in 1930
Churches in Sebastian County, Arkansas
Buildings and structures in Fort Smith, Arkansas
National Register of Historic Places in Sebastian County, Arkansas